Methylidynetricobaltnonacarbonyl is the organocobalt compound with the formula HCCo3(CO)9. It is a metal carbonyl cluster that contains the methylidyne ligand.  The compound has C3v point group symmetry. It is a purple, air-stable solid that is soluble in some organic solvents, but not in water.

The compound is prepared by the reaction of dicobalt octacarbonyl with bromoform. Much of the cobalt(0) is consumed in the formation of cobalt(II) bromide. An idealized equation for the synthesis is:

9 Co2(CO)8 + 4 CHBr3 → 4 HCCo3(CO)9 + 36 CO + 6 CoBr2

The potential of some analogues as catalysts for hydroformylation – including with acylidyne and arylidyne moieties – has been investigated.

The structure has been analyzed by X-ray crystallography.  The Co-Co distances are near 2.48 Å in length. The structure is related to that of dicobalt hexacarbonyl acetylene complexes and tetracobalt dodecacarbonyl, which are also tetrahedranes.

References

Organocobalt compounds
Carbonyl complexes